Saint Totnan (7th Century –  689 AD) an Irish Franconian apostle. He was born in Ireland and was martyred along with Saint Colman and Saint Kilian in Würzburg around 689. His feast day is July 8.

After Saint Totnan died, he was named patron saint of the Bishopric of Würzburg.

Saint Totnan's Statue was located in Alte Mainbruecke.

References

Further reading
 Book of Saints, by the Monks of Ramsgate
 Lives of the Saints, by Father Alban Butler
 Our Sunday Visitor's Encyclopedia of Saints

External links
 
 Image

People of medieval Bavaria
7th-century births
689 deaths
7th-century Christian saints
Medieval Irish saints on the Continent
Irish expatriates in Germany
7th-century Irish priests
Colombanian saints